Huie's Sermon is a 1981 documentary film made for television by Werner Herzog. It consists almost entirely of a sermon delivered by Huie Rogers of the Bible Way Church of Our Lord Jesus Christ in Brooklyn.

References

External links 

1981 films
West German films
1980s German-language films
German documentary films
Documentary films about Christianity in the United States
1981 documentary films
Films shot in New York City
1980s German films